Favartia nuceus is a species of sea snail, a marine gastropod mollusk in the family Muricidae, the murex snails or rock snails.

Description

Distribution
This marine species occurs off French Guiana.

References

 Garrigues B. & Lamy D. (2017). Muricidae récoltés en Guyane au cours de l'expédition La Planète Revisitée. Xenophora Taxonomy. 15: 29-38

Muricidae
Gastropods described in 1850